Ladzin  is a village in the administrative district of Gmina Rymanów, within Krosno County, Subcarpathian Voivodeship, in south-eastern Poland.

The village has a population of 510.

References

Ladzin